Saint Minas Church of Tehran, (Armenian: ,), is an Armenian Apostolic church in Tehran, Iran.

Location
It is located in the Armenian Fort , Ararat Street, in the northern suburb of Vanak of Tehran.

History
In 1856, Mirza Yousef Khan Mostowfi ol-Mamalek, funded building of a small chapel for the Armenians in the Armenian Fort of the village of Vanak, which he had resettled from Chaharmahal (hy). Current building is from 1875. In the hill across the Armenian Fort, there used to be an Armenian cemetery that in mid-20th century, Ararat Stadium was built in place of that.

Bibliography
هوویان، آندرانیک (۱۳۸۰). «کلیساهای ارمنیان در ایران». ارمنیان ایران. تهران: مرکز بین‌المللی گفتگوی فرنگ‌ها با همکاری انتشارات هرمس. ص. ۱۵۴–۱۴۹.

See also
Iranian Armenians
List of Armenian churches in Iran

References

Tourist attractions in Tehran
Armenian Apostolic churches in Tehran
Architecture in Iran